Kotak Mahindra Asset Management Company Limited (KMAMC), is the asset manager for Kotak Mahindra Mutual Fund (KMMF). KMAMC started operations in December 1998 and has approximately 74 lac investors in various schemes.

History
Kotak Mutual Fund is a wholly-owned subsidiary of Kotak Mahindra Bank Limited, and was established in December 1998.

In December 2020 it became the first Indian Mutual House to launch Global REIT Fund of Fund.

Organization

It is one of the first few private firms qualified to manage pension funds in India. It offers services like banking, asset management, investment banking, life insurance, stock broking and general insurance.

Currently, it has an investor base of above 2 million investors. It has a distribution network of around 43,000 distributors. The company is present in 82 cities and has 86 branches.

It is currently the 5th largest mutual fund house in the country with more than 2.86 lakh crore Assets Under Management. It currently operates out of 86 branches in India with headquarters in Mumbai, and has around 75 lakhs investor accounts, with a distribution network comprising 50000 empanelled distributors. It is currently managing more than 73000 of equity assets.

Products and services
Kotak Mutual Fund follows an institutionalized investment process. It includes investment universe, research, idea generation, company meeting and idea discussion, investment report, portfolio action and on-going review. The fund manager is the decision maker for their portfolios.

See also 

 Mutual funds in India
ICICI Prudential Mutual Fund
Axis Mutual Fund
Birla Sun Life Asset Management
SBI Mutual Fund
Unit Trust of India

References

 

Mutual funds of India
Financial services companies based in Mumbai
Kotak Mahindra Bank
1985 establishments in Maharashtra
Indian companies established in 1985
Financial services companies established in 1985